The Tsitsishvili is a Georgian noble family, with several notable members from the 15th century through the 20th.

The Tsitsishvili family was a continuation of the medieval house of Panaskerteli, known in the province of Upper Kartli (Samtskhe) from the 12th century, who derived their name from the castle of Panaskerti in Tao-Klarjeti. They came into prominence with Zachariah of Panaskerti, who, together with some other nobles, put down in 1192 the revolt against Queen Tamar of Georgia and were eventually enfeoffed with the duchy of Tao. His descendant, T'aqa Panaskerteli, Duke of Tao, defeated the Turkomans invading Georgia in about 1302 at Tortomi Castle.

In 1442, the king of Georgia, Vakhtang IV, married Sitikhatun, daughter of Prince Zaza I Panaskerteli. Pressured by the princes of Samtskhe of the Jaqeli dynasty, Zaza removed in 1467 to Inner Kartli, where he obtained from King Constantine II the fiefs of Khvedureti and Kareli. These formed the basis of a new princedom of the Panaskerteli, later known as Satsitsiano. The name Satsitsiano derived from the patronymic of Tsitsishvili, which was borne by Zaza's posterity, but must have been derived from an earlier member of the house called Tsitsi, and not, as has sometimes been supposed, from Zaza's son, for the patronymic is found already in an undated charter of King Alexander I of Georgia (r. 1412-1442).

The Tsitsishvili ranked as fifth among the six "undivided" princely houses of the kingdom of Kartli, a successor state of the already fragmented kingdom of Georgia. They intermarried with the royal dynasty and other nobility of Georgia and held several top hereditary offices at the court. In the 17th century, the house divided into the Upper and Lower branches, which entailed the loss of the family's dynastic status. Upon the Russian annexation of Georgia in 1801, the house of Panaskerteli-Tsitsishvili was received into the princely nobility of the empire under the name of Tsitsianov. Earlier, in 1724, a branch of this family, also known as Tsitsianov, was established in Russia by the expatriate Georgian nobleman Paata Tsitsishvili.

See also 

Avalishvili, another branch of the Panaskerteli family

References 

Georgian-language surnames
Noble families of Georgia (country)